Pablo Mauricio Rosales (born 10 March 1992) is an Argentine professional footballer who plays as a midfielder for Temperley.

Career
Rosales' career began with Estudiantes of the Argentine Primera División. In 2012, Rosales was on the bench three times during the 2012–13 season prior to making his first-team debut on 24 July 2013 in a Copa Argentina match against Quilmes. He made his professional league debut on 4 November in an away win versus River Plate. He went onto make forty appearances in his first four seasons with Estudiantes. In August 2016, Rosales joined fellow Primera División side Atlético Tucumán on loan. His Atlético Tucumán debut came against Atlético de Rafaela on 28 August.

In August 2017, Rosales completed a loan move to Olimpo. He made his debut in the Copa Argentina against Racing Club on 1 September. A total of five further appearances followed, before he returned to Estudiantes on 16 May 2018. He appeared eight times across the next two seasons, before departing in August 2020 to Primera B Nacional's Agropecuario.

On 20 December 2021, Rosales joined Temperley on a deal until the end of 2022.

Career statistics
.

References

External links

1992 births
Living people
Footballers from La Plata
Argentine footballers
Association football defenders
Argentine Primera División players
Primera Nacional players
Estudiantes de La Plata footballers
Atlético Tucumán footballers
Olimpo footballers
Club Agropecuario Argentino players
Club Atlético Temperley footballers